The COVID-19 pandemic in South Sudan is part of the ongoing worldwide pandemic of coronavirus disease 2019 caused by severe acute respiratory syndrome coronavirus 2. The virus was confirmed to have reached South Sudan on 5 April 2020. The first four confirmed cases were all UN workers.

Timeline

Prevention efforts 
On 14 March, South Sudan suspended flights to countries affected by coronavirus. On 20 March, classes in all schools and universities were suspended until 19 April, and Vice President Hussein Abdelbagi ordered the suspension of sporting, social, political, and religious gatherings for 6 weeks. This was followed on 25 March by a nighttime curfew from 8 p.m. to 6 a.m. On 27 March, around 500 people in quarantine from Sudan escaped in Renk, leading to northern Upper Nile State being placed under lockdown for 14 days. From 25 March, after the coronavirus reached Mali, to 5 April 2020, South Sudan was the largest country by area without any confirmed cases of COVID-19.

South Sudan has a population of 14 million people but only 4 ventilators.

April to June 2020 
 On 5 April, the first case of COVID-19 in the country was confirmed in a 29-year-old patient, a United Nations worker who arrived on 28 February from the Netherlands  via Ethiopia. South Sudan thus became the 51st African country (out of 54) to confirm a case. The patient was quarantined at a UN facility and contact tracing efforts were undertaken.

 The second case of COVID-19 was confirmed on 7 April; the patient was another female United Nations worker, aged 53, who arrived from Nairobi on 23 March and self-quarantined. The third case on 9 April was also a female United Nations worker who had been in contact with the first patient.

 On 9 April, the Ministry of General Education announced it was preparing a distance learning program for primary and secondary school students via radio and television. On 13 April, South Sudan suspended flights and public transportation between the states and between Juba and the states.

 Unlike the first cases, the fifth and sixth cases on 23 and 25 April were confirmed to be South Sudanese nationals.

 After 28 people tested positive on 28 April, the curfew was extended to be from 7 p.m. to 6 a.m., all restaurants were only allowed to be takeout, and all passenger boda bodas were banned.

 A total of 35 patients tested positive in April. All 35 were active cases at the end of the month.

 Although cases were still increasing, South Sudan began the process of reopening on 7 May. The curfew was decreased to 10 p.m. to 6 a.m., boda bodas were allowed to have one passenger and rickshaws two passengers, if both the driver and the passengers wore face masks, and shops were allowed to reopen with a maximum of five occupants at a time. On 12 May, airports were reopened for local, regional, and international flights.

 On 14 May, South Sudan reported its first death from COVID-19.

 On 18 May, First Vice President Riek Machar announced he and his wife, Angelina Teny, had tested positive for the virus. On 19 May 2020, Information Minister Michael Makuei Lueth and all members of the nation's 15-member coronavirus task force tested positive for COVID-19. Another Vice President, Hussein Abdelbagi, the head of the COVID-19 Task Force, tested positive on May 27. Vice President James Wani Igga announced he had tested positive on May 30.

 There were 959 new cases in May, raising the total number of confirmed cases to 994. Ten persons died in May while six patients recovered, leaving 978 active cases at the end of the month.

 In June there were 1013 new cases, bringing the total number of confirmed cases to 2007. The death toll rose by 28 to 38. The number of recovered patients increased to 279, leaving 1690 active cases at the end of the month.

July to December 2020 
 Towards the middle of July, business owners in Aweil reported that the pandemic had caused food prices to rise and that the number of customers in restaurants had decreased. On July 24, officials in Eastern Equatoria State reported an increase in the number of teenage pregnancies during the lockdown, which could lead to more school dropouts.
 The government reopened schools in September after six months of closure.
 There were 345 new cases in July, 167 in August, 185 in September, 222 in October, 183 in November, and 449 in December. The total number of cases stood at 2352 in July, 2519 in August, 2704 in September, 2926 in October, 3109 in November, and 3558 in December.
 The number of recovered patients stood at 1205 in July, 1438 in September, and 3131 in December, leaving 1101 active cases at the end of July, 1190 at the end of August, 1217 at the end of September, 1557 at the end of October, 94 at the end of November, and 364 at the end of December.
 The death toll rose to 46 in July, 47 in August, 49 in September, 59 in October, 61 in November, and 63 in December.

January to December 2021
 Vaccination started on 6 April, initially with 132,000 doses of AstraZeneca's Covishield vaccine provided through the COVAX pillar. After a slow roll-out, South Sudan decided to return 72,000 doses to COVAX and aim to administer the remaining 60,000 doses before their expiry date.

 Health ministry officials announced on 19 April that 60,000 doses of AstraZeneca's vaccine donated by the African Union and MTN Group would be destroyed because of their short expiry date.

 There were 403 new cases in January, 4049 in February, 2187 in March, 386 in April, 105 in May, 158 in June, 217 in July, 383 in August, 564 in September, 400 in October, 348 in November, and 2484 in December. The total number of cases stood at 3961 in January, 8010 in February, 10197 in March, 10583 in April, 10688 in May, 10846 in June, 11063 in July, 11446 in August, 12010 in September, 12410 in October, 12758 in November, and 15242 in December.

 The number of recovered patients increased to 3613 in January, 4217 in February, 9710 in March, 10312 in April, 10514 in May, 10799 in July, 11112 in August, 11617 in September, 12047 in October, 12463 in November, and 12934 in December, leaving 284 active cases at the end of January, 3699 at the end of February, 375 at the end of March, 156 at the end of April, 59 at the end of May, 203 at the end of June, 145 at the end of July, 214 at the end of August, 263 at the end of September, 230 at the end of October, 162 at the end of November, and 2173 at the end of December.

 The death toll rose to 64 in January, 94 in February, 112 in March, 115 in April, 117 in June, 119 in July, 120 in August, 130 in September, 133 in October, and 135 in December.

 Modeling carried out by the WHO’s Regional Office for Africa suggests that due to under-reporting, the true cumulative number of infections by the end of 2021 was around 4.9 million while the true number of COVID-19 deaths was around 1750.

January to December 2022
 There were 1552 new cases in January, 184 in February, 284 in March, 221 in April, 114 in May, 125 in June, 61 in July, 236 in August, 205 in September, 89 in October, 48 in November, and 32 in December. The total number of cases stood at 16794 in January, 16978 in February, 17262 in March, 17483 in April, 17597 in May, 17722 in June, 17783 in July, 18019 in August, 18224 in September, 18313 in October, 18361 in November, and 18393 in December.

 The number of recovered patients increased to 13077 in January, 13271 in February, 13514 in March, 17982 in September, and 18115 the last three months of 2022, leaving 3580 active cases at the end of January, 3570 at the end of February, 3610 at the end of March, 3831 at the end of April, 3945 at the end of May, 104 at the end of September, 60 at the end of October, 108 at the end of November, and 140 at the end of the year.

 The death toll rose to 137 in January and 138 in March.

Data 
 Cumulative number of confirmed cases, recoveries and deaths 

 Confirmed new cases per day 

 Confirmed deaths per day 

 Number of tests per day 

 Number of confirmed cases by age 

 Number of cases by sex

See also 
 COVID-19 pandemic in Africa
 COVID-19 pandemic by country and territory

References

South Sudan
South Sudan
Disease outbreaks in South Sudan
coronavirus pandemic
coronavirus pandemic
COVID-19 pandemic in South Sudan